N. N. Kannappa is an Indian stage and film artiste. He worked mainly in Tamil plays and films. He had his own troupe Navasakthi that staged several plays.

N. N. Kannappa featured in the following Tamil language films.

 Devaki (1951) - 1st film. Featured in the lead role with V. N. Janaki
 Manidhanum Mirugamum (1953)
 Naalvar (1953)
 Town Bus (1955) - paired with Anjali Devi
 Nannambikkai (1956)
 Paditha Penn (1956)
 Mala Oru Mangala Vilakku (1959)
 Paththarai Maathu Thangam (1959)
 Thamarai Kulam (1959)
 Thanthaikku Pin Thamaiyan (1960)
 Kappalottiya Thamizhan (1961) - as brother of Va. U. Si.
 Deivathin Deivam (1962)
 Ninaipadharku Neramillai (1963) - as Police Inspector in Guest role

Award
Tamil Nadu State government conferred the 1965-66 Kalaimamani award on him for best stage artiste.

References

 - "Even the great actor M.N. Kannappa, who was then a popular hero in the Nawab Rajamanickam theatre group, preferred the negative character of Judas"

 - "The first member on its rolls, as of 1955, was N. N. Kannappa,.."

External links
 (in Tamil)

Male actors in Tamil cinema
Tamil theatre
20th-century Indian male actors